Carstian Luyckx, also known as the Monogrammist KL (1623 – c. 1675), was a Flemish painter and draughtsman who specialized in still lifes in various subgenres including flower still lifes, fruit still lifes, fish still lifes, pronkstillevens (sumptuous still lifes), vanitas still lifes, hunting pieces and garland paintings.  He also painted animals and a few genre scenes.  After starting his career in Antwerp he is believed to have worked later in France.

Life
Carstian Luyckx was born in Antwerp in 1623 as the son of David Luycx en Margriet Cloot. He was baptized on 17 August 1623.  He studied painting under Philips de Marlier, a still life specialist, in 1642 and under Frans Francken III, a history painter, in 1645.

In 1645 he became a master of the Antwerp Guild of St. Luke.  He is documented in Antwerp up to August 1653.  It is believed that he left Antwerp and worked in France as many of his later works carry French inscriptions.  During his residence in France, Luyckx influenced other vanitas painters, including Simon Renard de St. André.

It is not clear when and where Luyckx died but his death date is assumed to fall between the years 1657 and 1677.

Work

General
Luyckx was a successful artist who worked in many still life genres and also painted animals and a few genre scenes.  He fell into oblivion after his death.   Only two dated works are known to exist, making it difficult to establish a chronology for his oeuvre.

Luyckx is known to have collaborated with other Antwerp painters.  The Gemäldegalerie Alte Meister in Dresden holds a painting referred to as Kitchen still life with vase of flowers, dead birds, fish and a cat.  It is a collaboration of Luyckx with David Teniers the Younger who painted the architectural elements and Nicolaes van Verendael who painted the flowers in a vase.  Luyckx painted the game still life, bird cage, dead fish and the cat.

Pronkstillevens

A large portion of his output consists of pronkstillevens, the sumptuous still lifes that were popular in Flanders and the Dutch Republic from the 1640s.  Luyckx’ work in this genre was influenced by the artist Jan Davidsz. de Heem who was active in both Antwerp and the Dutch Republic.  A representative example in this genre is the Opulent still life at the Montreal Museum of Fine Arts.  This work dates from about 1650 and is painted on copper.

Vanitas
Luyckx was especially known for his vanitas still lifes, a genre of still lifes which are intended as a reflection on the meaninglessness of earthly life and the transient nature of all earthly goods and pursuits.  He had followers in France such as Simon Renard de St. André and vanitas works by Luyckx have in the past been attributed to these artists.  This is for instance the case with the composition Vanitas still life with a skull, a violin, a musical score, a pipe and tobacco, an hourglass and a candle on a draped table (Sold at Sotheby's on 6 December 2012 in London, lot 201) previously given to St. André.  This composition shows a musical score, which contains a single vocal part of a religious Latin choral composition, the text of which specifically relates to death.  The inscription on the musical score probably refers to the 16th-century composer Orlande de Lassus.

Hunting pieces and animals
His hunting pieces (game still lifes) were influenced by the Flemish specialists in this genre Frans Snyders and especially Jan Fyt.  An example of his hunting pieces is A hunting still life of partridges with four Springer spaniels, a hawk, a game-bag and belt and other hunting gear in a landscape (Sold at Christie's on 20–21 November 2013 in Amsterdam, lot 168).  This work is believed to date to the transitional phase between Luyckx’ Antwerp and French periods in the 1650s.

Some fish still lifes by Luyckx are known, some of which were previously attributed to specialists of this genre such as Abraham van Beijeren or followers of Alexander Adriaenssen.

Luyckx painted compositions with life animals. A good example of this is the Fowl Attacked by a Fox (The Kremer Collection).  This composition gives a lively rendering of a fox catching a chicken amidst a group of fowl. The artist has aptly observed the startled reaction of the rooster nearest to the fox. The other fowl appear unaware of the danger that they are in.  The chicken that is being grabbed stares at the viewer more in surprise than in fear.

Flower and garland paintings
Carstian Luyckx painted flower paintings as well as garland paintings, a special type of still life developed in Antwerp at the beginning of the 17th century by Jan Brueghel the Elder in collaboration with the Italian cardinal Federico Borromeo. 

Other artists involved in the early development of the genre included Hendrick van Balen, Andries Daniels, Peter Paul Rubens and Daniel Seghers. The genre was initially connected to the visual imagery of the Counter-Reformation movement. It was further inspired by the cult of veneration and devotion to Mary prevalent at the Habsburg court (then the rulers over the Southern Netherlands) and in Antwerp generally).  Garland paintings typically show a flower garland around a devotional image, portrait or other religious symbol (such as the host).  Garland paintings were typically collaborations between a still life specialist and a figure painter.

Luyckx painted a number of garland paintings.  In a few of these the cartouche was painted later by an unknown hand.  An example is the Cartouche with Flowers (Princeton University Art Museum), which shows a flower garland around a portrait of Peter Paul Rubens painted at a later date by an unknown artist. This may be an indication that the painting had remained unsold during his lifetime. Luyckx rendered the flowers with such specificity that they can be identified easily. They are a combination of familiar Western European garden plants such as carnations and columbines as well as exotic varieties from the Orient, including the pink damask rose and the tulip. Luyckx included the rare parrot tulip, an extremely expensive variety at that time.

References

External links
 

Flemish Baroque painters
Flemish still life painters
Painters from Antwerp
1623 births
1670s deaths